Michele Pace del Campidoglio (1625-1669) was an Italian painter of still-life depicting fruit and flowers.

Biography
Pace del Campidoglio was born in Rome or Vitorchiano in 1625. He was called 'Di Campidoglio' from an office he held in the Campidoglio, or Capitol, at Rome. There was a fine picture by him in the collection of John Churchill, 1st Duke of Marlborough at Blenheim, and many others are to be found in England. He died in 1669 in Rome.

References

Attribution:
 

1610 births
1669 deaths
Italian still life painters
17th-century Italian painters
Italian male painters
Painters from Rome